The 1994 IAAF Grand Prix Final was the tenth edition of the season-ending competition for the IAAF Grand Prix track and field circuit, organised by the International Association of Athletics Federations. It was held on 3 September at the Stade Sébastien Charléty in Paris, France.

Noureddine Morceli (1500 metres) and Jackie Joyner-Kersee (long jump) were the overall points winners of the tournament.  A total of 17 athletics events were contested, nine for men and eight for women.

Medal summary

Men

Women

References
IAAF Grand Prix Final. GBR Athletics. Retrieved on 2015-01-17.

External links
IAAF Grand Prix Final archive from IAAF

Grand Prix Final
IAAF Grand Prix Final
International athletics competitions hosted by France
Athletics in Paris
IAAF Grand Prix Final
IAAF Grand Prix Final
IAAF Grand Prix Final
International sports competitions hosted by Paris